Tesla most commonly refers to:

 Nikola Tesla (1856–1943), a Serbian-American electrical engineer and inventor
 Tesla, Inc., an American electric vehicle and clean energy company, formerly Tesla Motors, Inc.
 Tesla (unit) (symbol: T), the SI-derived unit of magnetic flux density

Tesla may also refer to:

Companies and organizations
 Tesla (Czechoslovak company), a former state-owned conglomerate in the former Czechoslovakia
 Tesla Electric Light and Manufacturing, a former company in Rahway, New Jersey, US
 Tesla Science Center at Wardenclyffe, a proposed science museum in New York, US
 Nikola Tesla School at NY, a nationally ranked school in New York, US, founded by Bryan William Kim Short

Media and entertainment
 Tesla (band), an American hard rock band formed in Sacramento, California
 Tesla – Lightning in His Hand, a 2003 opera by Constantine Koukias
 "Tesla", a song on the 2013 album Nanobots by They Might Be Giants
 Tesla (2016 film), a 2016 film by David Grubin
 Tesla (2020 film), a 2020 film by Michael Almereyda

Places
 Tesla, a former coal mining town in Corral Hollow, California, US
 Tesla, West Virginia, US
 Tesla Fault, a geological formation in the Diablo Range, California, US
 Tesla River, Romania

Space
 2244 Tesla, an asteroid discovered in 1952
 Tesla (crater), a lunar crater

Science and technology
 Tesla (microarchitecture), a microarchitecture developed by Nvidia
 Teraelectronvolt Energy Superconducting Linear Accelerator, a proposed particle collider, now part of the International Linear Collider project
 Tesla valve, a fixed-geometry passive check valve
 Nvidia Tesla, a brand of GPGPU cards with the Tesla microarchitecture
 Tesla coil, a type of resonant transformer circuit

See also
 List of things named after Nikola Tesla
 List of Nikola Tesla patents
 Nikola Tesla (disambiguation)
 Nikola Tesla in popular culture
 
 
 Tesler, a surname 
TSLAQ, a loose collective critical of Tesla, Inc.